Aaron Dilloway (born 1976) is an American experimental musician. He is an improvisor and composer originally from Brighton, Michigan, who works with the manipulation of 8-Track tape loops in combination with voice, tape delays and various organic and electronic sound sources. A founding member of the industrial noise group Wolf Eyes (1998 - 2005), Dilloway now resides in Oberlin, Ohio, where he runs Hanson Records and Mailorder.

Biography
Dilloway was born in 1976 and grew up in Brighton, Michigan and as a teenager began attending house shows in the nearby college town of Ann Arbor. He formed a group called Galen in the 1990s, and soon after became a member of Couch, whom Galen had opened for at its first show. Dilloway then moved to Ann Arbor, where he began working with experimental and noise groups - one of which being Universal Indians - and where he would, eventually, co-found the group Wolf Eyes, with whom he would perform until 2004.

Late in 2004, Dilloway moved to Nepal, where he recorded prolifically (his own material, field recordings, and Nepalese radio broadcasts). He moved to Ohio in 2007, working with Emeralds among others, and releasing his own material. Among his releases are 2012's Modern Jester and 2017's The Gag File.

References

Further reading

External links
 Hanson Records official website

American experimental musicians
Musicians from Ann Arbor, Michigan
Living people
1976 births
People from Brighton, Michigan
People from Oberlin, Ohio